The list of ship decommissionings in 2013 includes a chronological list of ships decommissioned in 2013.

References

2013
Ship